Clam Bayou is a 170-acre estuary between Gulfport, Florida, St. Petersburg, Florida, and Boca Ciega Bay. The neighborhood around the estuary is also known as Clam Bayou. The area is popular with kayakers. It is also home to the 10-acre Clam Bayou Nature Park that includes a canoe and kayak launch point.

Trash, sediments, and pollution have become a problem as the surrounding areas were developed. Approximately 127 acres of Clam Bayou are publicly owned and a restoration project in 2010-2011 sought to improve water quality outflows to Boca Ciega Bay.

Clam Bayou Nature preserve is located at 34th Ave. S. & 40th St. S. in St. Petersburg, or south of 29th Avenue South on Miriam Street in Gulfport. It includes habitat for fiddler crabs, clams, wading birds, dolphins, and manatees. Observation decks provide a view over the brackish water estuary and there are trails.

Nearby, the city of Gulfport operates a full-service marina.

References

External links
 Clam Bayou Nature Preserve - St. Petersburg Parks & Recreation

Bodies of water of Pinellas County, Florida
Wetlands of Florida
Estuaries of Florida
Parks in Pinellas County, Florida